Ilir Butka, born 1965 is a film director and producer. He graduated the Albanian Academy of Arts in Tirana, Albania. Currently he is serving as Chairman of the Albanian National Centre of Cinematography, the official institution representing the Albanian cinema.

Career

Institutional 

 2014 to date – Chairman of the Albanian National Centre of Cinematography.
 2006 – Founder and President of the “Albania Film Commission”, member of the European Network of Film Commissions.
 2005 – 2014 Lecturer on film editing at the Faculty of Filmmaking at Academy of Arts in Albania.
 2003 – Founder of the Tirana International Film Festival (TIFF), the very first international film festival in Albania. He acted as TIFF Festival Director until 2014.
 2003 – Curator the international contest of photography in Albania at MARUBI

Director

 1989 – Starts working as painter and film director on animated films at “Kinostudio-Shqipëria e Re”.
 2002 – Made the short film Tunnel as a screenwriter, director and producer.
 2005 – Lectured at the Faculty of Film Directing at Academy of Arts in Albania.

Producer
 2007 – Realizes the documentary “DAMAREAMARE” as a screenwriter, film director and producer.

 1998-2005 Founder, Creative Director and Producer at FASADA STUDIOS, the very first audio-video production company established in Albania.

 2009 – While engaged with “Ska-ndal Production” he successfully produced movies such as “HONEYMOONS” – directed by Goran Paskalievic, (“GOLDEN Spike” award, as well as the FIPRESCI Award, the international jury of film critics, winner at Valladolid Film Festival, Best Film for Central & Eastern European at Cleveland International Film Festival, “Les Arcs European Film Festival”, Prix du Jury, winner of The Public Choice Awards at Thessaloniki International Film Festival).
 2011 – Producer of “LA NAVE DOLCE” – directed by Daniele Vicari, (winner of critics award “PASINETI Prize” at Venice Film Festival).
 He served as a member of the Selection Board of the Albanian National Center of Cinematography and Kosova Cinematography Center.
 Jury member of several film festivals, among which “Siena International Short Film Festival”, “Lecce European Film Festival”, “Maremetraggio International Short Films Festival”, “BRIFF International Short Films Festival”, “Balkanshorts”, “Alcine”.
 2000-2007 Member of “Lumiere Association” of Albanian filmmakers
 2007-2014 Member of the “Albanian Producers and Filmmakers Association”, APFA.
 He is a member of the European Film Academy.

 2002 – Director, scriptwriter and producer of the short movie “TUNNEL”.

References

Living people
Albanian film directors
1965 births
University of Arts (Albania) alumni